Francesca Amfitheatrof is a jewelry designer, known for her designs for Tiffany & Co. & Louis Vuitton.

Early life 
Francesca Amfitheatrof was born in Tokyo, Japan. Is the daughter of a Russian-American father, who was the bureau chief of Time magaz,ine and an Italian mother, who was a fashion publicist and worked for Valentino and Giorgio Armani. Amfitheatrof attended Cobham Hall School, a boarding school in England, while her parents lived in Moscow in the 1980s, but spent her childhood in New York, Moscow, Tokyo, and Rome. Her sister, Stefania, works in fashion and is a fiction copywriter.

She began her studies with a foundation course at Chelsea College of Arts, followed by a bachelor's degree at London's Central St. Martins and an MA at the Royal College of Art in 1993. In the same year her first silverware collection was presented by Jay Jopling of the White Cube gallery in London.

At the Royal College of Art, Amfitheatrof met and worked with Giovanni Corvaja, who taught and mentored her to create unique alloys, like blue or elastic gold.

After the Royal College of Art, she went to Padua, in northern Italy, to become an apprentice for Paulo Maurizi, who had previously worked with Corvaja.

As part of her school program at the Royal College of Art, Amfitheatrof was selected by Alberto Alessi from the Italian housewares and kitchen utensils company Alessi, to come to Milan and work with his company. In 2000, the Alessi Amfitheatrof design was presented. The Amfitheatrof FA01 Fruit Holder was then her most revered piece. Her work with Alessi developed into a fifteen-year partnership.

Career

Design 
After her studies, she came back to London and launched her collection with a show presented by Jay Jopling of White Cube gallery. The show consisted of sterling silver necklaces, gold rings and sterling silver vases. The vases were completely hand-raised by Amfitheatrof. This launched her into the fashion and art world, both Karl Lagerfeld and Giorgio Armani bought the complete collection of the vases.

After the success of her first show, she started selling jewelry through luxury fashion stores worldwide such as Colette Paris, Maxfield LA, Browns London, Selfridges London, Luisa Via Roma Florence, Jeffreys New York, Joyce Hong Kong, etc.

In 1995, Amfitheatrof started consulting for fashion brands on designing jewelry and accessories. She worked with brands like Rifat Ozbek, Balenciaga, Alice Temperley, Chanel, Fendi and Marni. For Marni, she launched their first eyewear collection and consulted for their accessories including shoes and bags. For Chanel, Amfitheatrof designed all the hardware for bags, shoes, belts and a line of silver jewelry.

Amfitheatrof became the in-house senior jewelry designer in 2001 for the British jeweler, Asprey & Garrard. A year after the brand split up, Amfitheatrof continued as head designer for another year with Garrard.

During her time as the consultant creative director at Wedgwood in 2008, Amfitheatrof created many new tabletop and glassware collections including their archival tea collection, which is still one of the best-selling gift items.

Art 
In 2001 she set up RS&A, a London-based contemporary artist agency with Mark Sanders and Julia Royse. They commissioned artists Yayoi Kusama, Maurizio Cattelan, the Chapman brothers - Jake and Dinos Chapman, Paul McCarthy and Damien Hirst to name a few.  Both "Art of Chess" and "Meet the Artist" projects were exhibited internationally and are part of major private collections.

From 2010 to 2013, Amfitheatrof was the head curator of the Gucci Museo in Florence and curated exhibitions globally.

In 2010, Amfitheatrof organized and curated the Damien Hirst exhibition "Cornucopia" at the Musée Océanographique in Monaco.

In 2011, Amfitheatrof curated and selected 23 works from the Francois Pinault Collection of Contemporary Art that was exhibited for the first time in Asia, in a show entitled "Agony and Ecstasy". This was presented at SongEun ArtSpace, Seoul, Korea.

The exhibition was then followed by the first solo exhibition in Asia of the Chapman brothers in 2013, entitled "The Sleep of Reason". It consisted of their contemporary works over the past two decades, which were then presented again at SongEun ArtSpace in Seoul.

In 2010, Amfitheatrof opened the Gucci Museo in Florence as Head Curator, featuring the video art titled "Amore e Morte" (2011) of American artist Bill Viola; followed by British artist Paul Fryer's "Lo Spirito Vola" (2012); then Cindy Sherman's "Early Works" (2013) exhibition, that included the photographic series "Bus Riders" and "Murder Mystery", and a short film "Dollhouse".

The last show Amfitheatrof curated was the 2013 solo exhibition of Portuguese artist Joana Vasconcelos: Red Independent Heart (2010), Psycho (2010), Lavoisier (2011) and Hand Made (2008). All the works exhibited at the Gucci Museo were loaned by the Francois Pinault Collection.

Tiffany & Co. 
After five years of searching for a design director, Tiffany & Co. appointed Amfitheatrof. She became the first-ever female design director in 2014. Her first collection, Tiffany T, was launched exactly a year after her arrival. She not only designed a range of minimalist necklaces, cuffs, and rings meant for layering and daily wear, but also created the advertising campaign which was shot by Craig McDean, styled by Karl Templer and featured Freja Beha Erichsen. The collection was designed by a woman for women. This was followed by the collections "Victoria Bows & Infinity" (2015), "Return to Love" (2016), "1837" (2017), "Collectibles" (2017), "Sweet Nothings" (2017).

During her three and a half years as the head design director, she spearheaded the repositioning of the Haute Joaillerie for Tiffany Blue Book Collection that comprised of 250 unique pieces. The collections were titled "The Art of the Sea" (2015), and "The Art of Transformation" (2016), and "The Art of the Wild" (2017). Amfitheatrof elevated Tiffany & Co.'s position in haute joaillerie. Amfitheatrof's Tiffany pieces were also recognized on the red carpet for award season. Cate Blanchett's turquoise beaded necklace for the 87th Academy Awards and diamond drop earrings for the 88th Academy Awards were highly publicized. In the 89th Academy Awards, both Emma Stone and Jessica Biel wore Amfitheatrof's "Whispers of the Rainforest" jewelry. Reese Witherspoon and Jennifer Garner are fans of Amfitheatrof's Tiffany designs as well.

Breaking from tradition for the first time ever, Amfitheatrof created a partnership between Tiffany & Co. and Dover Street Market. This collection named "Out of Retirement" (2015) marks the first time Dover Street Market launched and supported a project of this magnitude across all their locations and markets. Tiffany & Co. broke from its storied tradition by partnering with another retailer.

The "Out of Retirement" collection was inspired by the Tiffany archives. Amfitheatrof also designed the three installations in each Dover Street Market location, inspired by Gene Moore.

Amfitheatrof was responsible for all of Tiffany categories, these included small leather goods and watches. She launched the Half-moon SLG Collection with wave-embossed leather and gold-plated solid brass hardware. Amfitheatrof is also responsible for the design of the East West Automatic watch collection, featuring a dial turned 90 degrees.

In May 2017 she worked on the Gold, Silver and Leather Tiffany HardWear Jewelry Collection. This collection features Lady Gaga in the advertising campaign.

Pauer 
In March 2019 Francesca Amfitheatrof launched her own line originally under the name Thief & Heist and then rebranded in 2022 to Pauer,a new drop-driven, direct-to-consumer collection. In it she brought back the tag bracelet that was launched in the late 1990s and amassed a large following. 20 years later she brought it out again in a collaboration with Seventeen, one of the groups in the Kpop community. The tag is made using partly reground nylon and recycled silver. She also launched the Codebreaker Collection ,a modern take on the charms and ID. Using a patent pending mechanism to customise letters, symbols and studs in sterling silver under the banner The Metal is the Message customers can customise and personalise their pieces using universal charms called Brix to create and design their own pieces. The collection is made using 100% recycled silver and packaging made of ground pulp.

Personal life 
Amfitheatrof married Ben Curwin in Kensington in 2004. They later moved from London to New York with their two children, Stella May and Nikolai.

Boards 

Amfitheatrof is president of the US board of Sarabande, the Alexander McQueen Foundation in London. She is also a member of the US board of the Royal College of Art, London.

References 

American jewelry designers
Tiffany & Co.
Year of birth missing (living people)
Living people 
People educated at Cobham Hall School
Place of birth missing (living people)
Women jewellers